Paul Nichols (born January 25, 1981) is an American college football coach and former player. He is quality control specialist for offense at the Georgia Institute of Technology, a position he assumed in 2018.  Nichols served as the head football coach at Davidson College from 2013 to 2017, compiling a record of 7–43.

Head coaching record

References

External links
 Georgia Tech profile
 Davidson profile

1981 births
Living people
American football quarterbacks
Davidson Wildcats football coaches
Davidson Wildcats football players
Georgia Tech Yellow Jackets football coaches
Marshall Thundering Herd football coaches
Ohio State Buckeyes football coaches
Toledo Rockets football coaches
People from Dunwoody, Georgia